The 2023 New Year Medalist Curling was held from December 30 to January 1 at the Curling Hall Miyota in Miyota, Japan. The total purse for the event was ¥ 2,000,000. It was the fifth event on the World Curling Tour Japan for the 2022–23 curling season.

The event was won by the German rink of Daniela Jentsch, Emira Abbes, Lena Kapp and Analena Jentsch from Füssen, who after losing their first game, won five straight games to claim the event title. In the final, they defeated Karuizawa's Asuka Kanai, who they had lost to the in opening draw. To reach the final, Team Jentsch won 6–5 over Canada's Isabelle Ladouceur in the quarterfinals and then beat Sapporo's Sayaka Yoshimura 7–4 in the semifinals. Team Kanai had a direct berth to the semifinals by finishing 3–0 in pool play and beat Sapporo's Mayu Minami 6–1 to advance to the final. Miyota's Wakaba Kawamura also qualified for the playoffs but was eliminated 7–4 by Team Minami in the quarterfinals. Miyota's Arisa Kotani and Yuri Nakajima rounded out the field of eight teams.

Teams
The teams are listed as follows:

Round robin standings
Final Round Robin Standings

Round robin results
All draw times are listed in Japan Standard Time (UTC+09:00).

Draw 1
Friday, December 30, 9:00 am

Draw 2
Friday, December 30, 2:30 pm

Draw 3
Friday, December 30, 6:00 pm

Draw 4
Friday, December 30, 9:30 pm

Draw 5
Saturday, December 31, 9:00 am

Draw 6
Saturday, December 31, 2:30 pm

Playoffs

Source:

Quarterfinals
Saturday, December 31, 6:00 pm

Semifinals
Sunday, January 1, 8:00 am

Final
Sunday, January 1, 1:00 pm

Notes

References

External links
Official Website
CurlingZone

2022 in Japanese sport
2023 in Japanese sport
2022 in curling
2023 in curling
December 2022 sports events in Japan

Curling competitions in Japan
International curling competitions hosted by Japan
Sport in Nagano Prefecture
January 2023 sports events in Asia